An air taxi is a small commercial aircraft that makes short flights on demand.

In 2001 air taxi operations were promoted in the United States by a NASA and aerospace industry study on the potential Small Aircraft Transportation System (SATS) and the rise of light-jet aircraft manufacturing. Since 2016, air taxis have reemerged as part of the burgeoning field of eVTOL.

Regulation
In Canada, air taxi operations are regulated by Transport Canada under Canadian Aviation Regulation 703. The Canadian definition of air taxi includes all commercial single-engined aircraft, multi-engined helicopters flown by visual flight rules by one pilot and all multi-engined, non-turbo-jet aircraft, with a maximum take-off weight  or less and nine or fewer passenger seats, that are used to transport people or goods or for sightseeing.

In the US, air taxi and air charter operations are governed by 14 CFR Part 135 and 14 CFR part 298 of the Federal Aviation Regulations (FAR).

See also
 Air Taxi Association
 Commercial aviation
 General aviation
 Very light jet
 NCFlyPorts
 Passenger drone
 Fractional Jets
 eVTOL

Air Taxi operators
 Airstream Jets
 ImagineAir
 Joby Aviation
 Propair

References

General aviation